WBOX-FM is a radio station broadcasting on 92.9 FM in Varnado, Louisiana. The station is owned by Best Country Broadcasting, LLC, and carries a country format. The station is co-owned with WBOX 920 in Bogalusa.

WBOX-FM is an affiliate of the LSU Sports Radio Network and carries LSU football, men's and women's basketball, and baseball games.

History

WBOX-FM signed on the air in November 1985. While a sister to WBOX 920 AM, the two stations initially carried different formats, with 920 airing country music and 92.7 adopting an adult contemporary sound.

WBOX-AM-FM was sold to Bogue Chitto Communications for $325,000 in 1988; the sale made the pair sisters to four radio stations in Mississippi. Both stations changed to contemporary country formats. The station was required to move to 92.9 from 92.7 as a result of an upgrade proposal for station WQCK licensed to Clinton, Louisiana (now WBKL).

Best Country Broadcasting, owned by Ben Strickland, acquired WBOX-AM-FM for $150,000 in 2002.

References

External links

1985 establishments in Louisiana
Radio stations established in 1985
Radio stations in Louisiana